Tanabe Mitsubishi Pharmaceutical Soccer Club was a Japanese football club based in Osaka that belonged to Mitsubishi Tanabe Pharma. The club played in Japan Soccer League (Japanese former top division) for one season in 1973. It last played in the Osaka Prefectural Leagues.

Tanabe Pharmaceutical co-founded both the second tier (1972 Japan Soccer League Second Division) and third tier (1992 Japan Football League Division Two) of Japanese football with neighbors Kyoto Sanga FC and Vissel Kobe. However, unlike them, they never became a J. League club nor won the Emperor's Cup, though they came close in 1980 - the first finalist from the second tier.

Club name
1927–1943: Tanabe Gohee Shoten S.C.
1943–2006: Tanabe Pharmaceutical S.C.
2007–2018: Tanabe Mitsubishi Pharma S.C.

Honours

League titles
JSL Division 2
Champions (1): 1975
Runners-up (1): 1972
Kansai Soccer League
Champions (2): 1970, 1993
Runners-up (2): 1971, 1996

Cups
Emperor's Cup
Runners-up (1): 1980
All Japan Works Football Championship
Winners (7): 1950, 1951, 1952, 1953, 1954, 1955, 1957
Runners-up (2): 1948, 1956

External links
Football of Japan

 
Football clubs in Japan
Japan Soccer League clubs
1927 establishments in Japan
Football clubs in Osaka
Japan Football League (1992–1998) clubs
Association football clubs established in 1927
Defunct football clubs in Japan
Works association football clubs in Japan
2018 disestablishments in Japan